Windsor, Canada may refer to:
Grand Falls-Windsor, Newfoundland and Labrador
Windsor, Nova Scotia
Windsor, Ontario
Windsor, Quebec